Mahulbonir Sereng ( Songs of Mahulbonir or Tribal song Mahulbonir) is a 2004 Bengali film directed by Sekhar Das based on a same name story of Tapan Bandyopadhyay This film was released at 13th Brisbane International Film Festival 2004 and 19 April 2005 at Filmfest DC in Washington.

Plot
The story is a narrative revolving around the love triangle of Aghore (Pijush Ganguly), with  his wife Saheli (Chandrayee Ghosh) and Dr. Alaktak Roy (Silajit Majumder). Aghore is a police constable who works in a different place so he often stays out of hometown, in the meantime his wife Saheli gets closer with the new young doctor of their village. When Aghore came back, he get the news the Saheli is pregnant, he becomes very happy. But the all of villageman claims that the baby is the doctor's and not of Aghore's. Though Aghore tries to argue in favour of his wife and doctor but the village head calls 'Gira' by gram Panchayet (Judgement by 10 village heads). On the day of 'Gira' Saheli commits suicide and the narrator Damayanti (Roopa Ganguly) helps the doctor to run away. Another parallel story of Damayanti and Somesh Gomes (Sabyasachi Chakrabarty) goes side by side. Somesh is a social worker, the love interest of Damayanti who is the B.D.O. of that tribal area. Twelve years after this incident Damayanti comes back to the village of Mahulbani and finds that besides many changes the beauty and simplicity of nature still exists.

Cast 
Sabyasachi Chakrabarty as Somesh Gomes
Roopa Ganguly as Damayanti
Arindam Sil as husband of Damayanti
Aparajita Auddy
Chandrayee Ghosh as Saheli
Debshankar Halder
Debesh Roy Chowdhury
Pijush Ganguly as Aghore
Silajit Majumder as Dr Alatak Roy
Kunal Mitra as Damayanti's Senior Officer

References

External links
 "A Ray for a Ray; so what?s new?" at telegraphindia.com

2000s Bengali-language films
2004 films
Bengali-language Indian films
Films based on short fiction